Jury selection in the United States is the choosing of members of grand juries and petit juries for the purpose of conducting trial by jury in the United States.

Voir dire
During voir dire, potential jurors are questioned by attorneys and the judge. It has been argued that voir dire is often ineffective at detecting juror bias. Extended voir dire in major controlled substance trials may increase accuracy in predicting individual verdicts from 50% to 78%.

Federal
In the federal system, jury selection is governed by the Jury Selection and Service Act and by the Federal Rules of Criminal Procedure in criminal cases, and by the Federal Rules of Civil Procedure in civil cases. In capital cases, each side gets twenty peremptory strikes. In other felony cases, the defendant gets ten peremptory strikes and the government gets six. In misdemeanor cases, each side has three peremptory strikes.

State
Each U.S. state has its own system, which is subject to the requirements of the U.S. Constitution.

The Jury Selection Process 

A typical jury selection process in the U.S. :

 The county creates a list of potential jurors from records.  Exactly which records are used vary by state, but they may include state tax filers, motor vehicle registrants, voter lists, or even utility lists.
 The county selects randomly from the list of potential jurors and sends those people a juror summons to appear at a particular court on a particular date.
 Potential jurors arrive at the courthouse and are placed in a juror pool.
 When a particular court needs jurors, a set of people from the juror pool are drawn randomly and placed on a panel that is assigned to that court.
 After instruction from the judge, panelists are chosen at random and placed on the jury.
 The judge and attorneys ask the jurors questions to look for potential bias or prejudice (for example, knowledge of one of the subjects of the trial).  Such jurors will be dismissed and replaced by a new member from the panel.  (If necessary, additional panelists may be recruited from the juror pool.)
 When a complete jury is formed, possibly with alternate jurors, the remaining panelists are dismissed and the trial begins.

Constitution

Impartiality Clause

Vicinage Clause

Federal criminal petit juries are required to be composed of residents of the state and federal judicial district wherein the crime was committed, which district shall have been previously ascertained by law.

Faults within the jury selection process
 

The juror selection process holds the potential for discrimination in the selection of jurors and the final composition of juries. Claims that errors (of all types) were made during jury selection are among the most common of all grounds for criminal appeals. With regard to legal proceedings within the U.S. military, one argument has been advanced that selection of juries for courts-martial is subject to too much control by commanders, who can pick jurors who will be most likely to convict and hand down heavy penalties.

Batson v. Kentucky,  banned peremptory challenges based solely on race, although the U.S. Supreme Court has since acted to mitigate its impact. The issue of racial bias in jury selection has been complicated by the question of whose rights are implicated; the prospective juror's, or the defendant's. A Michigan Law Review article, published in 1978, asserted that young people, during that period, were under-represented on the nation's jury rolls.

A 2012 study from Duke University published in the Quarterly Journal of Economics investigated the effect of jury selection and racial composition on trial outcomes. The study found that black defendants (81%) are significantly more likely than whites (66%) to be convicted when there are no potential black jurors in the pool. Even with only one black member of the jury pool, conviction rates are almost identical (71% for blacks and 73% for whites). While 64% of cases had at least one black potential juror in the pool, only 28% of all trials had one or more black members on the seated jury. "Whenever attorneys use peremptory challenges to strike black members of the pool ... they forgo the possibility of excluding another potential juror with a similar ex ante probability of convicting," and the composition of the jury indirectly reflects that of the juror pool.

A 2018 study published in the University of Illinois Law Review found that prosecutors and judges tend to remove more African-Americans while defense attorneys remove more whites.

As of 2014, the 9th Circuit Court of Appeals has held that a peremptory challenge based on perceived sexual orientation is unconstitutional.

References

Selection